"Dum Dum Diddle" is a song by ABBA, released on their 1976 album Arrival. In 1977 it was released as a promo single in Argentina on the RCA label.

Production
When asked "how did [ABBA] manage to make such a ridiculous and quite banal song [as Dum Dum Diddle] come alive", Björn Again founder Rod Leissle said "I think ABBA had a special quality about them. They could put ridiculous lyrics into a song, and because they were fundamentally great songwriters they could make it work. A line like 'Dum Dum Diddle, to be your fiddle' doesn't really make a great deal of sense, but it still works because it's something you can sing along to and enjoy".

Composition
"Dum Dum Diddle" is a folk-inspired pop song. The song has Lasse Wellander's acoustic guitar in the verses. Benny plays piano during the breaks between the girls' "woh-woh" vocals. The song has a fiddle-style refrain (simulated by a synthesiser), which serves as its hook. It contains a "stream of strong melodies and instrumentation". The lead vocals are shared by Agnetha Fältskog and Anni-Frid Lyngstad.

Synopsis
The song is about a woman who quietly longs for the affections of a sad, lonely man who derives his only pleasure from constantly playing and practicing on his violin. The Guardian described it as "a song about a woman who feels sexually threatened by her partner's violin".

Critical reception
Abba's Abba Gold suggests that ABBA criticised the song, but adds that the writers of the book like it. Abba - Uncensored on the Record said the "unfortunately titled song ... seemed like a reversion to Eurovision-style thinking". The complete New Zealand music charts, 1966-2006 describes the song as "rather silly but fun". Bright Lights Dark Shadows: The Real Story of Abba implied that Eagle was more lyrically ambitious than "the 'dum dum diddles' of ABBA's earlier work". The Los Angeles Times described the song as "cheery nonsense". The Scotsman implied that "Dum Dum Diddle" was a bad song by saying: "LIFE – to quote Toni Collette in Muriel's Wedding – can be 'as good as an Abba song' but the clunky transfer of Mamma Mia! from stage to screen proves that it can be just as awful as 'Dum Dum Diddle' too."

Covers
Helen Sjöholm has performed "Dum Dum Diddle", accompanied by Orsa Spelman's Kalle Moraeus on the fiddle.

References

1976 singles
1976 songs
ABBA songs
Atlantic Records singles
Epic Records singles
Polar Music singles
Songs written by Benny Andersson and Björn Ulvaeus